Carabus kalabi is a species of beetle from family Carabidae. The species are black coloured.

References

kalabi
Beetles described in 1990